Elachista louisella is a moth of the family Elachistidae that is found in California.

The forewings are dirty white, dusted with pale brown scales especially broadly along the costa and in the tornal area. The hindwings are light grey and the underside of the wings is grey.

Etymology
The species name is an artificial combination of letters.

References

Moths described in 1997
louisella
Endemic fauna of California
Moths of North America
Fauna without expected TNC conservation status